Mostsy is a rural locality (a selo) in Vtorovskoye Rural Settlement, Kameshkovsky District, Vladimir Oblast, Russia. The population was 22 as of 2010.

Geography 
Mostsy is located 16 km southwest of Kameshkovo (the district's administrative centre) by road. Kizhany is the nearest rural locality.

References 

Rural localities in Kameshkovsky District